The Beach Soccer Worldwide tour is a series of competitions in beach soccer. The competitions allow national teams to compete in beach soccer in a round-robin format over the summer months.

BSWW Tour Casablanca - Casablanca, Morocco – July 23–25

Participating nations

Final standings

Schedule and results

BSWW Tour Sunderland - Sunderland, England – July 30–August 1

Participating nations

Current standings

Schedule and results

See also
Beach soccer
Euro Beach Soccer League

External links
Beach Soccer Worldwide

2010 in beach soccer
2010
2010 in Moroccan sport
2010 in English sport
International association football competitions hosted by Morocco
International association football competitions hosted by England
Sport in Casablanca
Sport in the City of Sunderland
July 2010 sports events
August 2010 sports events